Arctic rose may refer to:

Arctic Rose (album) by Susan Aglukark
Arctic Rose, fishing vessel lost in the Bering Sea in April 2001 with 15 dead; see Seattle Fishermen's Memorial
Rhodiola rosea, a perennial herbaceous plant used in traditional medicine, unrelated to roses in the genus Rosa
Rosa acicularis, a shrub in the genus Rosa